The 2011–12 Missouri State Bears basketball team represented Missouri State University during the 2011–12 NCAA Division I men's basketball season. The Bears, led by first year head coach Paul Lusk, played their home games at JQH Arena and are members of the Missouri Valley Conference. They finished the season 16–16, 9–9 in Missouri Valley play. As the six seed, the Bears lost in the quarterfinals of the Missouri Valley Basketball tournament to Evansville.

Roster

Schedule

|-
!colspan=9| Exhibition

|-
!colspan=9| Regular season

|-
!colspan=9| Missouri Valley Conference tournament

References

Missouri State Bears basketball seasons
Missouri State